Pont Henri (or Ponthenri) is a small rural village in Wales, located in the centre of the Gwendraeth Valley, halfway between the towns of Carmarthen and Llanelli. Most of the village comes under the Parliamentary constituency of Llanelli and the jurisdiction of Llanelli Rural Council. The rest of the village is represented by Carmarthen East and Dinefwr constituency and Llangendeirne Community Council. The electoral boundary in Pont-Henri follows the course of the Gwendraeth Fawr river.

There are now no shops, although the village has two pubs (The Incline and The Baltic Inn) and a social club. Other facilities include a take-away, a community hall, a play area, a football pitch, a Baptist chapel and an industrial estate. Ponthenry railway station opened in 1909 and closed in 1953.

Some of the village's famous residents include former Wales goalkeeper Ron Howells and former Wales Darts Captain Eric Burden. BBC Rugby correspondent Gareth Charles is also from Pont-Henri.

In June 1989, a Westland WS-61 Sea King Helicopter encountered an issue and was forced to make an emergency landing on the village green, it then crashed onto the village green scattering debris in the vicinity and within 70 meters of the village school. One of the Rotor blades hit a nearby house, but nobody was injured in the incident.

References

Villages in Carmarthenshire
Llanelli Rural